Fabio Frittelli (24 July 1966 – 6 February 2013), better known by his pseudonym Mo-Do, was an Italian musician. Mo-Do appeared in the 1990s as an Italian electronic music act. Although Mo-Do was Italian, his songs were in German.

History

Origin of the name 
The name Mo-Do is claimed to originate from first letters of Frittelli's birth town (Monfalcone) and the day of his birth (Domenica, i.e. "Sunday" in Italian), respectively.

Career 
Mo-Do was formed when Frittelli met producer Claudio Zennaro. Other producers who worked with Frittelli (sometimes quoted as members of the group) were Fulvio Zafret, Mario Pinosa and Sergio Portaluri.

Mo-Do is probably best known for the single "Eins, Zwei, Polizei" (co-produced with Zennaro and Zafret) which reached No. 1 in the German, Austrian and Italian music charts.

Death 
Frittelli was found dead at his home in Italy on 7 February 2013, at age 46. Police ruled his death a suicide.

Discography

Album
 Was ist das? (Metronome Records, 1995)

Singles

Non-album single; only appeared on the Lithuanian CD release of Was ist das? as a bonus track

References

External links 
 Mo-Do Biography in the Eurodance Encyclopedia

1966 births
2013 deaths
2013 suicides
People from Monfalcone
Italian electronic musicians
Italian house musicians
German-language singers
Remixers
Suicides in Italy
20th-century Italian musicians